Chenarestan (also Romanized as Chenārestān; also known as Chenār Sū (Persian: چِنار سو) and Chinār Su) is a village in Hemmatabad Rural District, in the Central District of Borujerd County, Lorestan Province, Iran. At the 2006 census, its population was 684, in 169 families.

References 

Towns and villages in Borujerd County